Beyond the Wall of Sleep is the second solo album by guitarist Christian Muenzner. The album was released as a digital download and CD on May 26, 2014.

Christian Muenzner started writing the songs for this album between October 2012 and May 2013. In early 2014, Muenzner started a campaign to fund his album and by April, the goal was reached the album was funded completely.

Track listing

Personnel
Christian Muenzner – guitar
Terry Syrek - lead guitar on track 2
Jimmy Pitts – keyboards
Linus Klausenitzer – bass
Hannes Grossmann – drums
Danny Tunker – lead guitar on track 1

Production
Per Nilsson – producer, mastering

References

2014 albums